Oliver Cromwell (1599–1658) was an English military and political leader and later Lord Protector of the Commonwealth of England, Scotland and Ireland.

Oliver Cromwell may also refer to:

People
 Oliver Cromwell (died 1655) (c. 1562–1655), English landowner, lawyer and politician, uncle of the Lord Protector
 Oliver Cromwell (American soldier) (1752–1853), African-American soldier in the American Revolutionary War
 Oliver Eaton Cromwell (1892–1987), American mountain climber

Other uses
 "Oliver Cromwell" (song), a Monty Python song about the Lord Protector
 BR Standard Class 7 70013 Oliver Cromwell, a steam locomotive
 Oliver Cromwell (ship), the largest ship in the Connecticut State Navy
 MV Oliver Cromwell, a Dutch barge/riverboat/floating hotel
 Oliver Cromwell, a symphony by Rutland Boughton

See also

 Cromwell (disambiguation)
 Cromwellian (disambiguation)
 

Cromwell, Oliver